Rugby union in Lesotho, and its predecessor Basutoland is a minor but growing sport.

Governing body
The governing body is the Federation of Lesotho Rugby.

History

Rugby in Lesotho began after the year 2000 given the influx of students studying in South African schools where rugby union is a major sport. It was further intensified by the expatriate population who worked with local people to develop rugby. In 2008, National University of Lesotho organized a team known as NUL Spears Rugby Club. The club only participated in Intervarsity held between universities of Botswana, Lesotho and Swaziland.

Rugby is centred on the national capital, and only sizable city, Maseru. Lesotho's poverty and lack of infrastructure make it difficult to maintain a proper national league structure.

The country is surrounded on all sides by South Africa. Rugby union in South Africa is a major sport - the country has both hosted and won the Rugby World Cup - and Lesotho is saturated by South African media of various types. Lesotho can therefore be considered one of several countries within South African rugby's sphere of influence - including Namibia, Zimbabwe, Swaziland, and Botswana.

Maseru Kings
In late 2011 the Maseru Kings Rugby Club was established in the capital. The team joined and began competing in the Eastern Free State leagues in South Africa in May 2012. As the only team regularly playing in Lesotho the Maseru Kings have become the de facto national team.

See also
 Lesotho national rugby union team 
 Confederation of African Rugby
 Africa Cup

External links
 CAR Ads
 Lesotho le theha mokhatlo oa Rugby
 University Rugby Team return Victorious
  Historique

References

 
Sport in Lesotho